United High School is a public high school located in the northern portion of Laredo, Texas, United States, and is a part of the United Independent School District.  A new campus  opened on August 24, 2009, for the 2009-2010 school year to alleviate overcrowding at the old campus.  Freshman students have been placed in a new campus right next to the main campus. It is the most populated school in Laredo.

Attendance boundary
Communities within the United High boundary include portions of Laredo and the following census-designated places:

 Bonanza Hills
 Botines
 Four Points
 La Moca Ranch
 Los Corralitos
 Los Minerales
 Los Huisaches
 Los Veteranos II
 Ranchos Penitas West
 Sunset Acres

Feeder schools
Feeder middle schools include Elias Herrera Middle School and George Washington Middle School.

Magnet school
United High School also houses the United Engineering & Technology Magnet, which has a robotics program.

"The Protected School"
The school was built to contain civil defense facilities. United High School was the subject of a 1965 propaganda film issued by the Office of Civil Defense, "The Protected School".

Notable alumni

Steve Asmussen (Class of 1985), horse trainer and racer
 Ana Rodriguez (Miss Texas USA 2011)
Edgar Valdez Villareal, captured drug lord for the Betran-Leyva Cartel
Marco Antonio Flores

References

External links

 
 United Independent School District

High schools in Laredo, Texas
United Independent School District high schools
Magnet schools in Texas